Honeytribe is an American blues rock band formed in Saint Louis, Missouri. Its founder and bandleader is Devon Allman, son of Gregg Allman of the Allman Brothers Band, who is the lead guitarist, vocalist, and frontman. The other members are George Potsos on bass, and Gabriel Strange on drums In October 2012, Allman confirmed that Honeytribe was going on hiatus, while he continues to tour with Royal Southern Brotherhood and prepares for a tour to support his new solo album.

History
Honeytribe was formed by Devon Allman in 1999. In 2001, the band broke up so Allman could spend time with his newly born son. They reformed in 2005 and started Honeytribe's path as a career: making records and touring. They have toured throughout North America and Europe

Origin of Band Name
The name of the band is attributed to former member Marko (Mark Oyarzabal).  According to Devon, one day the two of them were driving, and trying to think of names.  They discussed how their dynamic sound could be super smooth and delicate, and also big, bad and fierce, and that they needed a name to reflect that dichotomy.  Marko's first idea was "Honeytribe?", and Devon agreed with "Yeah! Sweet like honey, fierce like a tribe, it's perfect!"

Discography

Torch
In 2006, the band released their debut album, Torch,
to favorable reviews.
The album was recorded at Ardent Studios in Memphis, Tennessee.

Space Age Blues
Space Age Blues is the second album by Devon Allman's Honeytribe. It was released in Europe on October 12, 2010, and in U.S.A on October 25, 2010. In addition to the power-trio of Devon Allman, George Potsos and Gabriel Strange, the album also contains appearances by Huey Lewis on harmonica and Ron Holloway on tenor saxophone.

Members

 Devon Allman – guitar, vocals (1999–2001, 2005–present)
 George Potsos – bass guitar (1999–2001, 2005–2011)
 Gabriel Strange – drums (2008–2011)

Past members
 Mark Oyarzabal – drums (1999–2001, 2005–2008)
 Jack Kirkner – keyboards (1999–2001, 2005–2008)
 Justin Hanson – drums (2011–2012)
 Steve Duerst – bass guitar (2008–2009)

References

External links
 The Tribal Community: Devon Allman's Honeytribe
 Devon Allman biography at allmusic.com

American blues rock musical groups
Musical groups from St. Louis
Rock music groups from Missouri
Musical groups established in 1999
1999 establishments in Missouri
Provogue Records artists